Agastophanes is a monotypic snout moth genus. It was described by Alfred Jefferis Turner in 1937. It contains the species Agastophanes zophoxysta, known from Queensland, Australia.

References

Epipaschiinae
Monotypic moth genera
Moths of Australia
Pyralidae genera